Frankenstein is a television horror film first aired in 1992, based on Mary Shelley's 1818 novel Frankenstein; or, The Modern Prometheus. It was produced by Turner Pictures and directed by David Wickes.

The movie stars Patrick Bergin as Dr. Frankenstein and Randy Quaid as Dr. Frankenstein's creation. It also features John Mills, Lambert Wilson, and Fiona Gillies. The score was composed by John Cameron.

Plot
Starting at the North Pole, a sea captain and his explorer crew encounter Dr. Frankenstein and his creature trying to kill each other. The doctor is saved. As he warns the captain of danger, he tells how he made his creature in the Switzerland of 1818 by way of chemical and biological construction which the creature is a clone (of sorts) of Frankenstein himself, establishing a psychic bond between Creator and his Creation.

Cast
Patrick Bergin as Dr. Frankenstein
Randy Quaid as Frankenstein's monster
John Mills as De Lacey
Lambert Wilson as Dr. Clerval
Fiona Gillies as Elizabeth
Jacinta Mulcahy as Justine
Timothy Stark as William
Roger Bizley as the Captain

Reception
On review aggregator website Rotten Tomatoes, the film holds an approval rating of 17% based on 6 reviews, and an average rating of 3.3/10.

References

External links

1992 films
Frankenstein films
1992 television films
1992 horror films
Films scored by John Cameron
Films set in 1818
Films set in Switzerland